84 Motorised Brigade was a formation of 8 South African Armoured Division, a combined arms force consisting of infantry, armour and artillery.

The brigade was formed on August 1, 1974 in Durban as part of the 8 South African Armoured Division. The Brigade was located at Lords Grounds, which has a military history since 1842.

Initial Structure 
Under this reorganisation, the following units were transferred from Natal Command to the new command:

Brigade Training and Exercises 
As a Citizen Force formation, 84 Motorised Brigade would make use of call-up orders for its personnel to generally report for 3 months service. Headquarters staff would then leave for Lohatla, where a transfer camp would be established to process troops en route to the operational area in northern South West Africa. Processing of units would include personal documentation, a medical examination, inoculation and the issuing of equipment and weapons. Each unit on completion of the necessary processing, would entrain to the Olienhoutplaat Station for a six-day journey to Grootfontein, the railhead near the Operational Area.
All 84 Brigades units had at one time or another served in the Operational Area and at the end of the Republic Festival celebrations in 1981 elements of 84 Motorised Brigade were airlifted from Durban for border duties.

Insignia

Leadership

Notes

References 

Infantry brigades of South Africa
Disbanded military units and formations in Durban
Military units and formations established in 1974
Military units and formations of South Africa in the Border War
Military units and formations disestablished in 1992